Boycho Popov (born 13 August 1970) is a Bulgarian biathlete. He competed in the men's 20 km individual event at the 1992 Winter Olympics.

References

External links
 

1970 births
Living people
Bulgarian male biathletes
Olympic biathletes of Bulgaria
Biathletes at the 1992 Winter Olympics
Place of birth missing (living people)